is an island in the Pacific Ocean. It is part of the Kerama Islands group in Shimajiri District, Okinawa Prefecture, Japan.
This small island is linked by a bridge to Fukaji and Aka islands.

References

Islands of Okinawa Prefecture
Kerama Islands